Stellicomitidae is a family of crustaceans belonging to the order Siphonostomatoida.

Genera:
 Asterocomes Rao, 1962
 Astroxynus Humes, 1971
 Chorioxynus Humes, 1986
 Leicomes Humes, 1971
 Molucomes Kim, 2007
 Onychopygus Humes & Cressey, 1958
 Stellicomes Humes & Cressey, 1958

References

Siphonostomatoida